The 1996–97 Iowa Hawkeyes men's basketball team represented the University of Iowa as members of the Big Ten Conference. The team was led by 11th year head coach Tom Davis, and played their home games at Carver-Hawkeye Arena. They finished the season 22-10 overall and 12–6 in Big Ten play. The Hawkeyes received an at-large bid to the NCAA tournament as #8 seed in the West Region, losing 75-69 in the Round of 32 to the eventual National Runner-Up Kentucky Wildcats.

Roster

Schedule/Results

|-
!colspan=9| Regular Season
|-

|-
!colspan=12| NCAA tournament

Rankings

Awards and honors
 Andre Woolridge – Third-Team AP All-American; First-Team All-Big Ten; First men's player in Big Ten history to lead the conference in scoring (20.2 ppg) and assists (6.0 apg) in same season

References

Iowa
Iowa
Iowa Hawkeyes men's basketball seasons
Hawk
Hawk